In quantum mechanics, the canonical commutation relation is the fundamental relation between canonical conjugate quantities (quantities which are related by definition such that one is the Fourier transform of another). For example,

In general, position and momentum are vectors of operators and their commutation relation between different components of position and momentum can be expressed as

where  is the Kronecker delta.

This relation is attributed to Werner Heisenberg, Max Born and Pascual Jordan (1925), who called it a "quantum condition" serving as a postulate of the theory; it was noted by E. Kennard (1927) to imply the Heisenberg uncertainty principle. The Stone–von Neumann theorem gives a uniqueness result for operators satisfying (an exponentiated form of) the canonical commutation relation.

Relation to classical mechanics 
By contrast, in classical physics, all observables commute and the commutator would be zero.

This observation led Dirac to propose that the quantum counterparts ,  of classical observables ,  satisfy

In 1946, Hip Groenewold demonstrated that a general systematic correspondence between quantum commutators and Poisson brackets could not hold consistently.

However, he further appreciated that such a systematic correspondence does, in fact, exist between the quantum commutator and a deformation of the Poisson bracket, today called the Moyal bracket, and, in general, quantum operators and classical observables and distributions in phase space. He thus finally elucidated the consistent correspondence mechanism, the Wigner–Weyl transform, that underlies an alternate equivalent mathematical representation of quantum mechanics known as deformation quantization.

Derivation from Hamiltonian mechanics
According to the correspondence principle, in certain limits the quantum equations of states must approach Hamilton's equations of motion. The latter state the following relation between the generalized coordinate q (e.g. position) and the generalized momentum p:

In quantum mechanics the Hamiltonian , (generalized) coordinate  and (generalized) momentum  are all linear operators.

The time derivative of a quantum state is -  (by Schrödinger equation). Equivalently, since the operators are not explicitly time-dependent, they can be seen to be evolving in time (see Heisenberg picture) according to their commutation relation with the Hamiltonian:

Further, since the Hamiltonian operator depends on the (generalized) coordinate and momentum operators, it can be viewed as a functional, and we may write (using functional derivatives):

In order to obtain the classical limit we must then have

The Weyl relations 
The group  generated by exponentiation of the 3-dimensional Lie algebra determined by the commutation relation  is called the Heisenberg group. This group can be realized as the group of  upper triangular matrices with ones on the diagonal.

It is relatively easy to see that two operators satisfying the above canonical commutation relations cannot both be bounded.

 so that, for any n,

However,  can be arbitrarily large, so at least one operator cannot be bounded, and the dimension of the underlying Hilbert space cannot be finite. If the operators satisfy the Weyl relations (an exponentiated version of the canonical commutation relations, described below) then as a consequence of the Stone–von Neumann theorem, both operators must be unbounded.

The resulting braiding relations for these operators are the so-called Weyl relations

These relations may be thought of as an exponentiated version of the canonical commutation relations; they reflect that translations in position and translations in momentum do not commute. One can easily reformulate the Weyl relations in terms of the representations of the Heisenberg group.

The uniqueness of the canonical commutation relations—in the form of the Weyl relations—is then guaranteed by the Stone–von Neumann theorem.

It is important to note that for technical reasons, the Weyl relations are not strictly equivalent to the canonical commutation relation . Since, as we have noted, any operators satisfying the canonical commutation relations must be unbounded, the Baker–Campbell–Hausdorff formula does not apply without additional domain assumptions. Indeed, counterexamples exist satisfying the canonical commutation relations but not the Weyl relations. (These same operators give a counterexample to the naive form of the uncertainty principle.) These technical issues are the reason that the Stone–von Neumann theorem is formulated in terms of the Weyl relations.

Generalizations 
The simple formula

valid for the quantization of the simplest classical system, can be generalized to the case of an arbitrary Lagrangian .

This definition of the canonical momentum ensures that one of the Euler–Lagrange equations has the form

The canonical commutation relations then amount to

where  is the Kronecker delta.

Further, it can be easily shown that

Using , it can be easily shown that by mathematical induction

generally known as Mc Coy's formula.

Gauge invariance
Canonical quantization is applied, by definition, on canonical coordinates.  However, in the presence of an electromagnetic field, the canonical momentum  is not gauge invariant.  The correct gauge-invariant momentum (or "kinetic momentum") is
   (SI units)     (cgs units),

Although the quantity  is the "physical momentum", in that it is the quantity to be identified with momentum in laboratory experiments, it does not satisfy the canonical commutation relations; only the canonical momentum does that. This can be seen as follows.

The non-relativistic Hamiltonian for a quantized charged particle of mass  in a classical electromagnetic field is (in cgs units)

This form of the Hamiltonian, as well as the Schrödinger equation , the Maxwell equations and the Lorentz force law are invariant under the gauge transformation

The angular momentum operator is

and obeys the canonical quantization relations

defining the Lie algebra for so(3), where  is the Levi-Civita symbol.  Under gauge transformations, the angular momentum transforms as

The gauge-invariant angular momentum (or "kinetic angular momentum") is given by

which has the commutation relations

where  is the magnetic field. The inequivalence of these two formulations shows up in the Zeeman effect and the Aharonov–Bohm effect.

Uncertainty relation and commutators 
All such nontrivial commutation relations for pairs of operators lead to corresponding uncertainty relations, involving positive semi-definite expectation contributions by their respective commutators and anticommutators.

Then

This follows through use of the Cauchy–Schwarz inequality, since
(Cf. uncertainty principle derivations.)

Uncertainty relation for angular momentum operators

For the angular momentum operators , etc., one has that

where  is the Levi-Civita symbol and simply reverses the sign of the answer under pairwise interchange of the indices. An analogous relation holds for the spin operators.

,

Consequently, the above inequality applied to this commutation relation specifies

hence

and therefore

so, then, it yields useful constraints such as a lower bound on the Casimir invariant: , and hence , among others.

See also 
Canonical quantization
CCR and CAR algebras
Conformastatic spacetimes
Lie derivative
Moyal bracket
Stone–von Neumann theorem

References

 .
 .

Quantum mechanics
Mathematical physics

zh:對易關係